Gerald Ngwenyama (born 15 June 1995) is a South African cricketer. He made his Twenty20 debut for Mpumalanga in the 2018 Africa T20 Cup on 14 September 2018.

References

External links
 

1995 births
Living people
South African cricketers
Mpumalanga cricketers
Place of birth missing (living people)